15374 Teta, provisional designation , is bright, stony Hungaria asteroid from the inner regions of the asteroid belt, about 3.3 kilometers in diameter. It was discovered by Czech astronomers Miloš Tichý and Zdeněk Moravec at Kleť Observatory in South Bohemia on 16 January 1997. It is named after Teta from Czech mythology.

Orbit and classification 

Teta is a bright E-type asteroid and member of the Hungaria family, which form the innermost dense concentration of asteroids in the Solar System. It orbits the Sun in the inner main-belt at a distance of 1.7–2.3 AU once every 2 years and 10 months (1,028 days). Its orbit has an eccentricity of 0.16 and an inclination of 32° with respect to the ecliptic. A first precovery was obtained during Digitized Sky Survey at Palomar Observatory in 1950, extending the body's observation arc by 47 years prior to its discovery.

Physical characteristics 

In 2014, an improved rotational lightcurve of Teta was obtained by American astronomer Brian Warner at his Palmer Divide Observatory in Colorado. Lightcurve analysis gave a rotation period of  hours with a brightness amplitude of 0.30 magnitude.

The Collaborative Asteroid Lightcurve Link assumes an albedo of 0.30 – a compromise value between 0.4 and 0.2, corresponding to the Hungaria asteroids both as family and orbital group – and calculates a diameter of 3.35 kilometers using an absolute magnitude of 14.4.

Naming 

This minor planet was named from Czech mythology after "Teta", the fortune-teller, heathen priestess, and member of the Přemyslid dynasty. She is the second daughter of Duke Krok and sister of Libuše, who, according to legend, founded the city of Prague (also see 2367 Praha) in the 8th century, and after whom the minor planets 264 Libussa and 3102 Krok were named, respectively. The approved naming citation was published by the Minor Planet Center on 11 November 2000 .

References

External links 
 Lightcurve plot of 15374 Teta, Palmer Divide Observatory, B. D. Warner (2009)
 Asteroid Lightcurve Database (LCDB), query form (info )
 Dictionary of Minor Planet Names, Google books
 Asteroids and comets rotation curves, CdR – Observatoire de Genève, Raoul Behrend
 Discovery Circumstances: Numbered Minor Planets (15001)-(20000) – Minor Planet Center
 
 

015374
Discoveries by Miloš Tichý
Discoveries by Zdeněk Moravec
Named minor planets
19970116